Dorothy Phillips (born Dorothy Gwendolyn Strible, October 30, 1889 – March 1, 1980) was an American stage and film actress. She is known for her emotional performances in melodramas, having played a number of "brow beaten" women on screen, but had a pleasant demeanor off. She garnered little press for anything outside of her work.

Career
Born Dorothy Gwendolyn Strible in Baltimore, Phillips was educated at the College of Expression of Maryland and once graduated acted with the George Fawcett Stock Co. Phillips began her career as a stage actress for Colonel Savage Productions acting in New York and Chicago. She made her film debut in 1911 on a two-reeler called The Rosary, and appeared in over 150 films during her career. For a time, she was nicknamed Kid Nazimova for her ability to imitate the Russian Hollywood actress Alla Nazimova. Phillips started at Universal Pictures often starring with Lon Chaney. Sometimes she would supplement these features with "shorts" filmed at Fox Studios. By 1917 Phillips had appeared in 22 films over two years and had suffered a breakdown due to exhaustion. It also caused a breach in her working relationship with director Joseph De Grasse and screenwriter/director wife, Ida May Park. 

]

Once she had rested and recovered, 1918 brought a series of successful films including A Soul For Sale, the first film starring her that was directed by her husband, Allen J. Holubar. Her pictures during this time scored highly with exhibitors and patrons alike. These successes and newfound working relationship between the couple prompted Phillips to leave Universal and in 1920 she and Holubar formed their own company, Allen Holubar Productions. Their pictures were released through First National Pictures to further acclaim throughout the 1920s.

Phillips' career slowed after 1927, and she mainly appeared in uncredited bit roles for the rest of her career. Her last appearance was in the 1962 classic western The Man Who Shot Liberty Valance.

Marriage and death
Dorothy Phillips was married to actor-director Allen Holubar for 11 years until his death in 1923 from pneumonia, following surgery, at the age of 33. They met when she was starring on stage in the Chicago production of "Every Woman" as the character of Modesty. After his death, she did not return to acting until mid-1925. Phillips also died of pneumonia, in 1980, at the age of 90. She is buried with her husband at the Secret Garden section of Hollywood Forever Cemetery in Los Angeles.

Legacy
For her contribution to the motion picture industry, Dorothy Phillips has a star on the Hollywood Walk of Fame, located at 6358 Hollywood Blvd. Phillips and Holubar's 1918 film, The Heart of Humanity, was shown at MOMA, The Museum of Modern Art in a 2014 exhibition.

Filmography

References

External links

Dorothy Phillips at Virtual History
portrait of Dorothy Phillips(moviecard)

1889 births
1980 deaths
Actresses from Maryland
American film actresses
American silent film actresses
Burials at Hollywood Forever Cemetery
Deaths from pneumonia in California
Actresses from Baltimore
20th-century American actresses